"Spending All My Time" (stylized as "Spending all my time") is a song by Japanese girl group Perfume from their fourth studio album Level3 (2013). The song was released as the album's second single on 15 August 2012. It was written, composed and produced by Yasutaka Nakata. The song is a dance pop track, which features instrumentation from synthesizers and keyboards. It is the group's first English-language single, and their second English effort since their 2008 track, "Take Me, Take Me", from their debut album Game.

"Spending All My Time" received favorable reviews from music critics, who commended the group's English-language attempt and praised the production and composition. The song became their seventh consecutive single to stall at number two on the Oricon Singles Chart in Japan. The track became their first charting single in Taiwan. Yusuke Tanaka directed the accompanying music video for the single, which shows Perfume as students in a psychic academy. Perfume has performed the song in a number of live performances throughout Japan.

Background and composition
Japanese producer and Capsule musician Yasutaka Nakata had written, arranged and composed the song. Nakata has collaborated with all of Perfume's records and songs from 2003 onwards. It was recorded in Tokyo, Japan and was mixed and mastered by Nakata. It is a dance and techno, and incorporates instrumentation from synthesizer and keyboards. Writing for Land of Rising, Alex Shenmue noted "'Spending all my Time' brings back the techno sounds after the dreaming atmosphere of Sleeping Beauty [...]” "Spending All My Time" is the group's first English-language single to date, and their second overall. A writer for CDJournal had compared the song to works by French disc jockey David Guetta and Swedish House Mafia, but called the composition “a little different,” to their previous work.

Perfume had found recording English lyrics hard; member Kashiyuka explained, "'Spending all my time' is completely in English, so I struggled really hard with the pronunciation. When I’m singing along to the melody, my accent becomes more Japanese – like katakana-speak, so I’m wondering what people outside Japan will think when they hear it [...] Also, it’s not a particular word, but I’m interested to know which genre people will classify us in as artists."”

Reception
"Spending All My Time" received favorable reviews from most music critics. Shenmue wrote that the new mix for the album “fits the album's concept.” Selective Hearing's writer Nia felt she could see the song alongside "Enter the Sphere" and "Party Maker" “blasting in a club, but there are also some surprisingly calm tracks on the album. It’s kind of like a series of crescendos and decrescendos”. Ian Martin, who had written their extended biography at Allmusic, had highlighted the song as an album standout and career standout. Patrick St. Michael, writing for The Japan Times, said the composition wasn't an “improvement” but commented that it was “simple, catchy pop”. A writer from CDJournal had favored the production and composition, comparing it to Western music.

The song charted in both Japan and Taiwan. Reaching number two on the Oricon Singles Chart, it became the group's eighth consecutive single to stall at number two. The song also reached number two on the Japan Hot 100 chart. The song reached number eight in Taiwan, becoming their first charting single in that country. In August 2012, "Spending All My Time" was certified gold by the Recording Industry Association of Japan (RIAJ) for shipments of 100,000 physical units.

Release and promotion
Selected as the second single of Level3, the song was released as a stand-alone digital download on 15 August 2012. Two CD singles were issued; a standalone CD with which included the b-sides "Point" and "Hurly Burly", and a bonus DVD version. The first B-side "Point" was used as the commercial song for "KIRIN Chu-hi Hyoketsu Yasashii Kajitsu no 3%". The second B-side, "Hurly Burly" was used as the commercial song for "KIRIN Chu-hi Hyoketsu". "Hurly Burly" was used as the closing theme song to the 2014 short film Fastening Days.

The official music video was directed by Japanese director Yusuke Tanaka and premiered on Perfume's YouTube channel in June 2013. It features Perfume in school uniforms and shows them using psychic abilities including psychokinesis, spoon bending, and using Zener cards. The scenes of the psychic abilities are bookended by band member A-chan unsuccessfully opening a door that is locked from the outside.

Track listing

Dimitri Vegas & Like Mike Remix

Credits and personnel
Details adapted from the liner notes of the "Mirai no Museum" CD single.

Song credits
 Ayano Ōmoto (Nocchi) – vocals
 Yuka Kashino (Kashiyuka) – vocals
 Ayaka Nishiwaki (A-Chan) – vocals
 Yasutaka Nakata – producer, composer, arranger, mixing, mastering.
 Dimitri Vegas & Like Mike – remixing

Visual credits
 Yusuke Tanaka – director
 Takahiko Kajima – video producer
 Kazunali Tajima – camera
 Mikiko – choreographer

Charts and certifications

Weekly charts

Certification

Release history

Notes

References

External links
 
 

2012 singles
2012 songs
English-language Japanese songs
Billboard Japan Hot 100 number-one singles
Perfume (Japanese band) songs
Song recordings produced by Yasutaka Nakata
Songs written by Yasutaka Nakata
Universal J singles